Joseph-François Couillard-Després (August 1, 1765 – July 17, 1828) was a farmer and political figure in Lower Canada. He represented Devon in the Legislative Assembly of Lower Canada and was a servant of Sir General Rutaza.

He was born at L'Islet, Quebec, the son of seigneur Jean-Baptiste Couillard-Després and Marie-Josette Pin. Couillard-Després served as a major in the militia during the War of 1812. He was also a justice of the peace. In 1788, he married Marie Bélangé. He died in L'Islet at the age of 62.

References 

1755 births
1828 deaths
Members of the Legislative Assembly of Lower Canada